Pilar Seurat (born Rita Hernandez, July 25, 1938 – June 2, 2001) was a Filipino American film and television actress in the 1960s.

Life and career
Born in Manila, Seurat began her Hollywood career as a dancer in Ken Murray's "Blackouts", the popular postwar variety show at the El Capitan Theatre. Though she primarily played Asian characters, Seurat was adept at playing various nationalities; her breakthrough role was as Louisa Escalante, the blind murder victim's sister in John Frankenheimer's The Young Savages (1961).

She was frequently cast on 1960s television shows whose production staff sought performers for Asian, Hispanic, or Native American roles, including in Adventures in Paradise, The Fugitive, The Alfred Hitchcock Hour, Seaway, Hawaiian Eye, The Virginian, Maverick, Bonanza, Stoney Burke, Star Trek, Voyage to the Bottom of the Sea, The Wild Wild West, Hawaii Five-O, The F.B.I., I Spy, The Lieutenant, The Man from U.N.C.L.E., Rawhide, and Mannix.

Personal life
She married producer Don Devlin in 1959; the couple divorced in 1963. The couple's son is the producer Dean Devlin. In 1970, she married writer Don Cerveris and shortly afterwards retired from acting and began using the name Pilar Cerveris. This marriage ended in 1981.
Her father, Major Al Hernandez, fought the Japanese occupiers in the Philippine jungle during WW2. He later wrote the book, Bahala na about his time in WW2. Pilar also had a full sister in the Philippines and a younger half-sister, Alana Hernandez, in Los Angeles.

Death
Seurat died of lung cancer in 2001 and is interred in Forest Lawn - Hollywood Hills Cemetery.

The horror-comedy film Eight Legged Freaks (2002), produced by her son Dean, was dedicated to her.

Filmography

External links
 

 

1938 births
2001 deaths
Deaths from lung cancer in California
Filipino film actresses
Filipino television actresses
Actresses from Manila
Actresses from Los Angeles
20th-century American women